Noszvaj is a village in Heves County, Northern Hungary Region, Hungary.

Sights to visit
 De La Motte palace
 Galassy palace

Gallery

References

Populated places in Heves County